Crahan is a hamlet in the parish of Wendron in Cornwall, England. Crahan is south of Wendron Churchtown.

References

Hamlets in Cornwall